2C-T-3 (also initially numbered as 2C-T-20) is a lesser-known psychedelic drug related to compounds such as 2C-T-7 and 2C-T-16. It was named by Alexander Shulgin but was never made or tested by him, and was instead first synthesised by Daniel Trachsel some years later. It has a binding affinity of 11nM at 5-HT2A and 40nM at 5-HT2C. It is reportedly a potent psychedelic drug with an active dose in the 15–40 mg range, and a duration of action of 8–14 hours, with visual effects comparable to related drugs such as methallylescaline.

See also 
 2C-T-2
 2C-T-4
 3C-MAL

References 

2C (psychedelics)
Entheogens
Thioethers
Amines